Iron monosilicide (FeSi) is an intermetallic compound, a silicide of iron that occurs in nature as the rare mineral naquite. It is a narrow-bandgap semiconductor with a room-temperature electrical resistivity of ca. 10,000 Ohm·cm and unusual magnetic properties at low temperatures. FeSi has a cubic crystal lattice with no inversion center; therefore its magnetic structure is helical, with right-hand and left-handed chiralities.

The structure is similar to that of sodium chloride, with four iron atoms and four silicon atoms in each unit cell. Whereas in sodium chloride the eight atoms are at the corners of a cube and each ion is surrounded by six counter-ions, in iron monosilicide the atoms are all displaced parallele to body diagonals (along 3-fold axes) from the positions of sodium and chloride. The crystal therefore loses symmetry, but retains the 2-fold screw axes and the 3-fold axes of the sodium chloride crystal structure. As a result of this displacement, an iron atom is about as close to a silicon atom on the same 3-fold axis as to any of the other six silicon atoms around it (instead of being  time further away as in sodium chloride). This means that each iron atoms has seven nearby silicon atoms, and conversely each silicon atom sits in a similar (enantiomorphic) cage of iron atoms. The cages only have 3-fold rotational symmetry, with three slightly different interatomic distances between the central atom and the seven surrounding atoms (to 3 atoms, 3 atoms, and 1 atom respectively). There are right-handed and left-handed 3-fold screw axes without there being a symmetry element taking one to the other. (Three-fold screw axes also exist in sodium chloride but are related by a mirror.) This means that iron monosilicide crystals exist in two different enantiomorphs.

In 1948 Linus Pauling investigated the nature of the bonds in iron monosilicide.

See also
Ferrosilicon

References

Iron compounds
Transition metal silicides
Iron monosilicide structure type